Hisamoto (written: 久本) is a Japanese surname. Notable people with the surname include:

, Japanese comedian, actress and singer
, Japanese baseball player

Hisamoto (written: 久元 or 尚基) is also a masculine Japanese given name. Notable people with the name include:

, Japanese politician
, Japanese kugyō

Japanese-language surnames
Japanese masculine given names